My First Wife is a 1984 Australian drama film directed by Paul Cox. The film won several AFI Awards in 1984.

Plot
The film follows the dissolution of John and Helen's marriage and the aftermath.

Cast
John Hargreaves as John
Wendy Hughes as Helen
Lucy Angwin as Lucy
David Cameron as Tom
Anna Maria Monticelli as Hilary
Betty Lucas as Helen's Mother
Lucy Uralov as John's Mother
Robin Lovejoy as John's father
Charles 'Bud' Tingwell as Helen's Father
Jon Finlayson as Bernard
Julia Blake as Kirstin

Production
The film was based on the breakdown of Cox's marriage. He started writing the script, showed it to Bob Ellis and the two men wrote the screenplay together. (Ellis says they spent a day and a half on it.)

The film was shot mostly at a house in Williamstown in Melbourne.

Music 
Choir: Members of the Tudor Choristers directed by David Carolane

Christoph Willibald Gluck:  "Orpheus & Euridice".

Berliner Symphoniker – Hermann Prey

Conductor – Horst Stein

Joseph Haydn - "Paukenmesse"

Bayerischen Rundfunks Symphony Orchestra & Chorus

Conductor – Rafael Kubelik, Polygram

Ann Boyd - "As I crossed a Bridge of Dreams", "Cycle of love", Faber Music Ltd.

Carl Orff - "Carmine Burana"

Czech Philharmonic Orchestra & Chorus, Conducted by Vaclev Smetacek, Supraphon

Rene Geyer - "Hot Minuets", Mushroom Records, Australia

Frans Sussmayr - "Grandfather's Birthday Celebration", Hungarian Radio Children's Chorus, Budapest Symphony Orchestra, Conductor – Laszlo Csanyl

Box office
My First Wife grossed $413,199 at the box office in Australia, which is equivalent to $1,049,525 in 2009 dollars.

Awards
My First Wife won in 1984 AFI Awards in the Best Actor in a Lead Role (John Hargreaves), Best Director (Paul Cox), Best Original Screenplay (Paul Cox, Bob Ellis) categories and was nominated in 4 more categories. Paul Cox also won the 1986 Grand Prix award at the Flanders International Film Festival in 1986.

See also
Cinema of Australia

References

External links

My First Wife at the Australian screen

1984 films
Australian drama films
Films directed by Paul Cox
1984 drama films
Films shot in Melbourne
1980s English-language films
1980s Australian films